Game Creek is a  tributary of the Salem River in southwestern New Jersey in the United States.

See also
List of rivers of New Jersey

References

Rivers of New Jersey
Tributaries of the Salem River
Rivers of Salem County, New Jersey